"Halftime Headliners" is the fourth episode of the sixth season of the American reality competition television series RuPaul's Drag Race All Stars, which aired on online streaming service Paramount+ on July 8, 2021. The episode has contestants impersonate famous singers and musicians and lip sync to a medley of RuPaul songs, inspired by Super Bowl's Halftime Shows. Jamal Sims served as guest judges, alongside regular panelists RuPaul, Michelle Visage and Carson Kressley.

Episode 

The ten remaining queens chose a singer or musician to impersonate in the "All Stars 6 Hall of Fame Half-Time Show", a tribute act in the form of a live medley of RuPaul’s songs. After rehearsing with Jamal Sims, A'Keria C. Davenport performs as Prince, Eureka! as Madonna, Ginger Minj as Fergie, Jan as Lady Gaga, Kylie Sonique Love as Steven Tyler, Pandora Boxx as Carol Channing, Ra'Jah O'Hara as Diana Ross, Scarlet Envy as Katy Perry, Trinity K. Bonet as Beyoncé and Yara Sofia as Shakira.

Runway
RuPaul introduces guest judges Sims, and reveals the theme for the runway: "The Frill of It All". Upon judgement, Kylie Sonique Love, Ra'Jah O'Hara, Scarlet Envy and Pandora Boxx are deemed safe. Eureka, Jan and Trinity K. Bonet receive positive feedback on their performances and runway looks, and Jan is announced as the winner of the challenge. A'Keria C. Davenport, Ginger Minj and Yara Sofia are all criticized for their performances, while their runway looks receive praise. Ginger Minj is declared safe from the bottom two. Due to the "RuMocracy System" adopted since the fifth season, all the contestants are called to vote to decree the elimination of the week.

After the vote Jan, the Top All-Star of the week, is called upon to challenge a lip sync assassin in a "Lip Sync for Your Legacy" to try to win a cash price of $20,000 and earn the power to eliminate a contestant at risk of elimination. The lip sync assassin is revealed to be Jessica Wild, a contestant from the second season of RuPaul's Drag Race. Jan and Jessica Wild lip sync against each other to Britney Spears' "Womanizer". Jessica Wild wins the lip sync and reveals that the queens voted to eliminate Yara Sofia from the competition.

Results

Voting history 

 The elimination was determined by the group's vote, for the Lip Sync Assassin won the Lip Sync for Your Legacy.

 The contestant was eliminated after their second time in the bottom.

Reception
Allison Shoemaker of The A.V. Club praised the Rusical for "Turn out uniformly solid performances".

See also
 List of Super Bowl halftime shows
 List of Rusicals

References

External links
 Halftime Headliners at IMDb

2021 American television episodes
American LGBT-related television episodes
RuPaul's Drag Race All Stars episodes